The  is a kei car built by the Japanese carmaker Daihatsu since 2018 as the successor to the Mira Cocoa & Mira.

The name "Tocot" is derived from phrases "To Character" (expression of one's ownness), "To Comfortableness" (safety, security and easiness of driving), and "To Convenience" (usability).

Gallery

References

External links 

 

Mira Tocot
Cars introduced in 2018
2020s cars
Kei cars
Hatchbacks
Front-wheel-drive vehicles
All-wheel-drive vehicles
Vehicles with CVT transmission
Retro-style automobiles